Events from the year 1645 in China.

Incumbents 
 Qing dynasty - Shunzhi Emperor
 Co-regent: Dorgon 
 Co-regent: Jirgalang
 Southern Ming pretender - Hongguang Emperor
 Shun dynasty — Li Zicheng
 Xi dynasty - Zhang Xianzhong

Events 
 Transition from Ming to Qing
 From newly captured Xi'an, in early April 1645 the Qing mounted a campaign against the rich commercial and agricultural region of Jiangnan south of the lower Yangtze River
 May 20-30 - Yangzhou massacre, one of the most destructive massacres in history
 June, Dorgon eventually decreed that all official documents should refer to him as "Imperial Uncle Prince Regent" (Huang shufu shezheng wang 皇叔父攝政王), which left him one step short of claiming the throne for himself.
 Sichuan massacre
 Regarding the Chinese Rites controversy, Rome's Sacred Congregation for the Propagation of the Faith sided with the Dominicans over the Jesuit in 1645 by condemning the Chinese rites based on their brief, rendering them incompatible with Roman Catholic faith
 Li Zicheng fled to Xi'an in Shaanxi. It is not exactly known how Li died and there are multiple accounts of his death which vary and some are exaggerated by folklore. Across multiple sources, the year of his death is said to be in 1645. One account states that in the summer of 1645 Li went to raid a village in search of sustenance with his remaining followers and was killed by soldiers guarding the village.

Deaths 
 Shi Kefa, Ming dynasty official and calligrapher, killed in the defense of Yangzhou
 Li Zicheng

References

Citations

Bibliography
. In two volumes.